The 1896 Centenary Gentlemen football team was an American football team that represented the Centenary College of Louisiana as an independent during the 1896 college football season. In their third year while located at the Jackson, Louisiana campus, the team compiled a 1–1 record.

Schedule

References

Centenary
Centenary Gentlemen football seasons
Centenary Gentlemen football